Thạnh Phú may refer to several places in Vietnam, including

Thạnh Phú District, a rural district of Bến Tre Province
Thạnh Phú (township), a township and capital of Thạnh Phú District
Thạnh Phú, Cần Thơ, a commune of Cờ Đỏ District
Thạnh Phú, Cà Mau, a commune of Cái Nước District
Thạnh Phú, Trà Vinh, a commune of Cầu Kè District
Thạnh Phú, Tiền Giang, a commune of Châu Thành District, Tiền Giang Province
Thạnh Phú, Sóc Trăng, a commune of Mỹ Xuyên District
Thạnh Phú, Long An, a commune of Thạnh Hóa District
Thạnh Phú, Đồng Nai, a commune of Vĩnh Cửu District

See also
Thạnh Phú Đông, a commune of Giồng Trôm District in Bến Tre Province